Providence Mission Hospital is a 523-bed acute care regional medical centre in Orange County, California with two campuses - one in Mission Viejo and the second in Laguna Beach. The hospital has designated adult and pediatric Level II Trauma Centres in the state of California. Mission Hospital provides cardiovascular, neuroscience and spine, orthopaedics, cancer care, women's services, mental health, wellness, and a variety of other speciality services. Mission Hospital in Laguna Beach (MHLB) provides South Orange County coastal communities with 24-hour emergency and intensive care as well as medical-surgical/telemetry services, orthopaedics, and general and GI surgery. CHOC Children's at Mission Hospital is a 48-bed facility that is the area's only dedicated pediatric hospital. Mission Hospital is one of only 3 Hospitals in Orange County rated as a Regional Trauma Center.

History 
Mission Hospital opened on August 11, 1971, with 124 patient beds, 330 employees and a medical staff of 41 physicians providing general acute care, including obstetrics, pediatrics, surgery, intensive care and emergency services.

This hospital, as well as other hospitals, are run by the non-profit Sisters of St. Joseph of Orange, California, through their Ministry. The Sister's Ministry was founded in 1650 in France, and in 1840 came to America. Their first Hospital Ministry was founded in 1912, and in 1920 their first hospital was opened in Eureka, California, based upon the caring for the needy. They now provide health care in California, Texas and New Mexico.

 In 1973, 89 new beds were added to accommodate growing demand.  Designated a paramedic base station.
 In 1974, cardiac rehabilitation opened.
 In 1976 a helipad opened
 In 1977 oncology services became available.
 In 1980 it became one of the six original Orange County hospitals designated as a regional trauma center.
 In 1981 the Oncology Care Unit opened.
 In 1988 the Heart Surgery and Angioplasty program was introduced.  The Mission Medical Tower and the Center for Rehab/Sports/Wellness opened along with a new four-level parking structure linking the upper and lower medical campuses and hospital services.
 In 1989, the Foundation at Mission Hospital Regional Medical Center was established to support community health education, medical staff research and programs to benefit the community.  Also, the Pediatric Intensive Care Unit opened, and the Neonatal Intensive Care Unit was upgraded to a Level II program.  The hospital acquired state-of-the-art MRI and CT scanners.
 The Mission Surgery Center and the Mission Regional Imaging Center opened.
 In 1992 the five-story patient tower opened, making Mission Hospital the largest medical center in south Orange County with a total of 274 beds.  The Fetal Diagnostic Center and the Mission Rehabilitation Center opened.
 In 1993 the Children's Hospital at Mission, now known as CHOC at Mission, opened on the fifth floor of Mission Hospital. It was the only pediatric hospital in south Orange County.
 In 1994 the Mission Hospital Regional Medical Center became a member of the non-profit St. Joseph Health System sponsored by the Sisters of St. Joseph of Orange.  As a non-profit hospital, the Mission Hospital Foundation broadened its scope to include raising funds for capital needs. The Pastoral Care department, later renamed Spiritual Care, was developed to meet the spiritual and emotional needs of patients and their families.
 In 1996 Mission Hospital collaborated with five other not-for-profit organizations to open the South Orange County Family Resource Center serving as a clearing-house for information and resources available to families. Mission Hospital assumed sponsorship of the South County Community Clinic, in San Juan Capistrano, renaming it Camino Health Center.
 In 2002 the Edward and Ann Muldoon Cardiac Center opened.
 In 2003 Mission opened a health center in Ladera Ranch. Along with the Mission Health Center in Rancho Santa Margarita, the urgent care center provides the community service for minor emergencies and basic health care needs, ranging from sprains to sore throats.
 In 2004 Community Health Improvement Services continues to expand offerings of community health education seminars, lectures, support groups and screenings that are free to the public. In ten years, Mission has invested close to $4 million toward community wellness programs that have served nearly 135,300 local residents.
 In 2005 Mission Hospital receives the Ernest A. Codman Award, from the Joint Commission on Accreditation of Healthcare Organizations for excellence in the use of outcomes measurement to achieve health care quality improvement in traumatic brain injury.

 In 2009 Mission Hospital embarked on a significant expansion of the hospital campus to accommodate the community's growing health care needs. This includes an expanded Emergency Department and Mission Regional Trauma Center as well as a new Cancer Institute. Mission Hospital in Mission Viejo also completed in 2009 the purchase of Laguna Beach Community Hospital, which is now Mission Hospital Laguna Beach. Major construction was completed on November 15, 2009, on Mission Hospital's $153 million , 4-story tall, 122-bed patient tower, making this one of the newest hospitals in the United States. Currently (2009) two of the floors (the basement and the second floor) are still empty and will be used for future expansions. The new tower includes a beautiful glass ceiling modern chapel that has a "hidden garden" outside for prayer and contemplation, and numerous other state of the art features. This makes Mission Hospital the largest Hospital and Trauma Center in the area with 552 beds, and the largest hospital in Orange County.

The new tower has external "X" beams incorporated into the exterior architecture for earthquake compliance, and this makes it possible for the patient rooms to have nearly wall-size windows.

See also 
 Providence St. Joseph Health
 St. Jude Medical Center

References

External links
 Official website

Hospital buildings completed in 1971
Children's hospitals in the United States
Hospitals in Orange County, California
Hospitals established in 1971
Mission Viejo, California